The United States Senate Committee on Veterans' Affairs deals with oversight of United States veterans problems and issues.

Description
The committee was created in 1970 to transfer responsibilities for veterans from the Finance and Labor committees to a single panel. From 1947 to 1970, matters relating to veterans compensation and veterans generally were referred to the Committee on Finance, while matters relating to the vocational rehabilitation, education, medical care, civil relief, and civilian readjustment of veterans were referred to the Committee on Labor and Public Welfare.

Congressional legislation affecting veterans changed over the years. For the members of the armed forces and their families in the nation's early wars – the Revolutionary War, the War of 1812, the Mexican War, the Civil War and the Spanish–American War – the response of the federal government had been essentially financial. This was clearly the legislative mission of the Senate Committee on Pensions which was created as one of the Senate's original standing committees in 1816 and continued until its termination in the Legislative Reorganization Act of 1946.

During World War I the nature of the congressional response to veterans' needs changed towards a more diversified set of programs. A war risk insurance program, which was referred to the Senate Finance Committee, changed the consideration of veterans benefits in the Senate. The Finance Committee was the Senate standing committee most responsible for veterans programs from 1917 to 1946. After World War II, the Finance Committee handled the Servicemen's Readjustment Act of 1944, the GI Bill of Rights, which extended to servicemen and their families, a number of benefits including unemployment assistance, education, vocational training, housing and business loan guarantees, as well as the traditional medical and pension benefits of previous times. Many experts believe this law was one of the most important elements in the expansion of the middle class following World War II.

The Veterans' Affairs Committee had nine members in its initial congress, the 92nd Congress (1971–73). It now has a total of 19 members.

Members, 118th Congress

According to committee members' official online biographies, two of the eighteen members are veterans: Richard Blumenthal and Dan Sullivan.

Chairs of the Senate Committee on Veterans' Affairs, 1971–present

Historical committee rosters

117th Congress

Source:

116th Congress

115th Congress

Source:

114th Congress

Source:

113th Congress

Source:  to 297

112th Congress

Source:

111th Congress

Source:  and

110th Congress

See also
 List of current United States Senate committees
 United States House Committee on Veterans' Affairs
 United States Department of Veterans Affairs

Notes

References

External links
 United States Senate Committee on Veterans' Affairs (Archive)
 Senate Veterans' Affairs Committee. Legislation activity and reports, Congress.gov.

1971 establishments in Washington, D.C.
Veterans' Affairs
Military-related organizations
Veterans' affairs in the United States